The vice president of the Republic of Korea was the second highest executive office in South Korea. The position was abolished in 1960. 

The following is a list of vice presidents of South Korea since its independence.

To avoid confusion, all the names on this list follow the Eastern convention (family name first, given name second) for consistency.

The first column counts (individuals number) and the second column counts (administration number/term number).

List of vice presidents of South Korea

Notes
The results of the 1960 election were invalidated after the April Revolution.
The office of Vice President was abolished after 1960.

References

Korea, South
Main
Lists of political office-holders in South Korea